Leptosiphon bolanderi (syn. Linanthus bolanderi) is a species of flowering plant in the phlox family known by the common name Bolander's linanthus.

Distribution
In California it is native to the Sierra Nevada and Northern California Coast Ranges, in chaparral, oak woodland, and Yellow pine forest habitats.

Description
Leptosiphon bolanderi is an annual herb producing a hairy, threadlike stem no more than about 20 centimeters tall. The oppositely arranged leaves are each divided into very narrow needlelike lobes just a few millimeters long.

The tip of the stem has an inflorescence of usually a single flower with a tubular purple or pink throat tinted yellow inside and enclosed in glandular sepals. The corolla has white or pink lobes a few millimeters wide. The bloom period is from March to July, depending on elevation and latitude.

External links
 Calflora Database: Leptosiphon bolanderi (Bolander's linanthus)
Jepson Manual eFlora (TJM2) treatment of Leptosiphon bolanderi
UC CalPhotos gallery: Leptosiphon bolanderi

bolanderi
Flora of California
Flora of Oregon
Flora of Washington (state)
Flora of the Sierra Nevada (United States)
Natural history of the California chaparral and woodlands
Natural history of the California Coast Ranges
Flora without expected TNC conservation status